J.B. Harold Murder Club, known as J.B. Harold no Jikenbo #1: Murder Club in Japan, is a 1986 murder mystery adventure game, developed by Riverhillsoft and released for the NEC PC-98, MSX, MS-DOS, NEC TurboGrafx-CD (TurboDuo) and Nintendo DS platforms. The TurboGrafx-CD version featured still photographs, text and audio voices as well as the option to select the language, English or Japanese. It was the first entry in the J.B. Harold series, which have been released on various platforms and sold 200,000 copies as of 2011.

Story and gameplay 
A horrible murder has taken place in the sleepy little town of Liberty.  Bill Robbins, a wealthy man known for his wild womanizing ways is the victim and, list of possible suspects keeps growing.  As J.B. Harold the player must figure out the who, what, where and why of the case.  To solve the mystery it will be necessary to travel to various locations, interview people and search for clues. The game is laid out over a grid map that displays various locations, though other than that, the game is mainly presented in the form of still photos.

Series 
J.B. Harold Murder Club is the first in the Japanese J. B. Harold series of murder mystery graphic adventure games, which includes Manhattan Requiem (1987), Kiss of Murder (1988), D.C. Connection (1989), and Blue Chicago Blues (1995). J.B Harold Murder Club was the first title in the series to be released in the United States. After the series sold 200,000 copies, an iOS version of the second game Manhattan Requiem was released in the Western world.

Nintendo DS 
In 2008, an enhanced remake of the game was released for the Japanese Nintendo DS, under the title Keiji J.B. Harold no Jikenbo: Satsujin Club.

Reception
Dennis Owens (in the voice of a character named "Rocco") reviewed the game for Computer Gaming World, and stated that "Da goods on dis game iz dat, if youse can fuhgit dat dis iz nuttin' but a compudah game, which da game in no ways lets youse fugit, den youse might finds its to be sum kind o' complex moidah mystery."

The PC Engine version was rated 21.74 out of 30 by PC Engine Fan magazine.

The game was reviewed in 1991 in Dragon #176 by Hartley, Patricia and Kirk Lesser in "The Role of Computers" column. The reviewers gave the game 4 out of 5 stars. They wrote that it is "a great game for mystery fans" and "a thinking game that is well worth the money".

TurboDuo reviews 
Video Games and Computer Entertainment critic, Donn Nauert, praised the game's sound, graphics, and playability, giving it an overall score of 9 out of 10. Defunct Games stated: "This is the type of game that will no doubt appeal to the gamers who love a good murder mystery, and while it's not perfect there's no denying that it's the best game of its kind. This is the type of game you don't see much anymore, which is a real shame because for what it is J.B Harold is a lot of fun". They gave the game a score of 70%.

GameSpot included the game in its list of titles that deserve an enhanced remake, stating that it was "one of the most difficult games ever made", had "some of the most memorable voice acting of all time", and that "to this day there isn't much out there quite like it". They compared it to more recent titles such as the adventure games Shenmue (1999) and Shadow of Memories (2001) as well as the role-playing video game Star Wars: Knights of the Old Republic (2003), saying that it similarly features "character interaction as the major gameplay element" and has "a similar type of multiple phrase response".

Controversy 
The game generated some controversy for its reference to a fictional, unsolved rape. As Donn Nauert wrote: "I don't think this is a subject that the American public is comfortable with in a video game, even though it's not dealt with graphically..." In their review of the game, Dragon also criticized it for not including "a warning on the box about the mature subject matter in this game" in reference to the unsolved rape case.

Notes

References 
Video Games and Computer Entertainment, July 1991, p. 44

External links
 
 

1986 video games
Adventure games
DOS games
First-person adventure games
FM Towns games
FM-7 games
IOS games
MSX games
NEC PC-8801 games
NEC PC-9801 games
Nintendo DS games
Nintendo Switch games
Rape in fiction
Riverhillsoft games
Sharp X1 games
X68000 games
Single-player video games
TurboGrafx-CD games
Video game controversies
Video games developed in Japan